Vänstern i Svenska kyrkan is a nominating group of consisting of members of the Left Party that work within the Church of Sweden. In 2001, the Left Party had decided to participate with their own list for the Church Assembly elections. The participation did however flop (the party got 1.8%), and there was a large deal of dissatisfaction within the party concerning one of the assembly members elected (a priest, who did not support the party policy of supporting gay rights). Ahead of the 2005 elections, the Left Party decided not to run. Instead, ViSK was formed by a group of individual party members who wanted to run. The Left Party did not give any financial support to the electoral campaign of ViSK. 

ViSK presented lists in five dioceses, and got 1.1% of the vote and three assembly members elected to the Church Assembly.

External links
 ViSK - Vänstern i Svenska kyrkan homepage.
 

Nominating groups in Church of Sweden politics
Left Party (Sweden)
Christian socialist organizations